These lists of fossiliferous stratigraphic units in Europe enumerate the rock layers which preserve the fossilized remains of ancient life in Europe by the modern countries wherein they are found.

Graphical atlas

Clickable map of Europe, showing the standard convention for its continental boundary with Asia. (see boundary between Europe and Asia for more information).

Legend: blue = Contiguous transcontinental states; green = Sometimes considered European but geographically outside Europe's boundaries.

See also

 Lists of fossiliferous stratigraphic units

Fossiliferous
.Fossiliferous